Dermanura is a genus of leaf-nosed bats.

Genus Dermanura
Andersen's fruit-eating bat, Dermanura anderseni
Aztec fruit-eating bat, Dermanura azteca
Bogota fruit-eating bat, Dermanura bogotensis
Gervais's fruit-eating bat, Dermanura cinerea
Silver fruit-eating bat, Dermanura glauca
Gnome fruit-eating bat, Dermanura gnoma
Pygmy fruit-eating bat, Dermanura phaeotis
Dermanura rava
Rosenberg's fruit-eating bat, Dermanura rosenbergi
Toltec fruit-eating bat, Dermanura tolteca
Thomas's fruit-eating bat, Dermanura watsoni

References

 
Taxa named by Paul Gervais